Untouchable Sound is the sixth, posthumous album by The Make-Up.  It is their second live album (although "live" sounds were added to the studio recordings of Destination: Love - Live! At Cold Rice).  On this album only, Alex Minoff joined The Make-Up on guitar.  Track #11, "Wade in the Water," is a cover of a traditional African-American spiritual song of the same name.

Track listing (LP) 
"Intro" − 2:13
"Save Yourself" − 5:21
"Every Baby Cries the Same" − 4:14
"Hey!  Orpheus"" − 2:30
"Call Me Mommy" − 2:53
"They Live by Night" − 4:07
"I am a Pentagon" − 3:29
"Prophet" − 3:03
"Bells" − 4:16
"Born on the Floor" − 3:14
"Wade in the Water" − 5:17
"White Belts" − 2:36
"C'mon, Let's Spawn" − 3:41

Sample

The Make-Up albums
Live albums published posthumously
2006 live albums
Drag City (record label) live albums